Robert M. "Bobby" Roberts (May 9, 1929 – October 10, 2004) was a musician, producer, record executive and Hollywood film producer.

In 1964, Roberts co-founded Dunhill Productions, which became Dunhill Records the following year. Roberts also managed performers such as The Mamas & the Papas, Richard Pryor, Mort Sahl, Cass Elliot, Paul Anka, Ann-Margret, Johnny Rivers and many others.

Roberts formed Mums Records with Hal Landers and Don Altfeld in 1972. The label, which was distributed by Columbia Records, had several notable releases, including Albert Hammond's hit single "It Never Rains in Southern California", and the album Slow Flux by Steppenwolf.

Works 
IMDb credits Roberts as serving as producer or executive producer of nine TV or film productions.

Film

Television

References

External links 
 

1929 births
2004 deaths
20th-century American businesspeople
American film producers
American music industry executives